The Gandhi Hill (elevation ) is a hill in Vijayawada, situated behind the Vijayawada railway station in the Tarapet area. A Gandhi Memorial, built on this hill, is the first in the country to have seven stupas. The hill is also popularly known by the name of Gandhi. The hill was formerly known as ORR hill.

Memorial 

Gandhi Hill is considered as a monument of Indian Independence struggle and pays homage to Father of the nation, Mahatma Gandhi. The Gandhi Hill Memorial has a stone slab with inscriptions of Gandhi quotations. The facility has a library and a planetarium, and offers a show on the father of the nation.

See also 

List of tourist attractions in Vijayawada

References 

Geography of Vijayawada
Memorials to Mahatma Gandhi
Tourist attractions in Vijayawada